The 2007 Al Amarah bombings occurred on December 13, 2007 when three simultaneous car bombs detonated in Al Amarah, Iraq, capital of Maysan province. The attack left 46 people dead and 149 others wounded.

The explosions hit Dijlah Street, a commercial thoroughfare, destroying  shops and restaurants. According to witnesses the second car bomb, which was the most powerful of the three, blew up in front of Jalal Restaurant. As people were rushing to help the injured at the restaurant the third explosion occurred.

References

2007 murders in Iraq
21st-century mass murder in Iraq
Bombings in the Iraqi insurgency
Building bombings in Iraq
Car and truck bombings in Iraq
December 2007 events in Iraq
Mass murder in 2007
Terrorist incidents in Iraq in 2007